The 2009 NC State Wolfpack football team represented North Carolina State University in the 2009 NCAA Division I FBS football season. The team's head coach was Tom O'Brien. It was O'Brien's third season as NC State's head coach. The Wolfpack played their home games at Carter–Finley Stadium in Raleigh, North Carolina. The Wolfpack finished the season 5–7, 2–6 in ACC play and failed to qualify for a bowl game.

Preseason
On June 27, linebacker Nate Irving was seriously injured in an automobile accident and will not play for the 2009 season, as he suffered a compound fracture in his leg and a collapsed lung.

Schedule

Coaching staff
After not traveling with the team to Blacksburg, Virginia for the Virginia Tech game, it was announced that offensive coordinator Dana Bible had been diagnosed with leukemia.

References

NC State
NC State Wolfpack football seasons
NC State Wolfpack football